The following lists events that happened during 1937 in South Africa.

Incumbents
 Monarch: King George VI. 
 Governor-General: 
 The Earl of Clarendon (until 19 March), 
 John Stephen Curlewis (acting, 19 March to 5 April)
 Sir Patrick Duncan (starting 5 April).
 Prime Minister: James Barry Munnik Hertzog.
 Chief Justice: John Stephen Curlewis.

Events
January 
 15 – The Empire Exhibition, South Africa closes in Johannesburg.

February
 1 – The Aliens Act No. 1 is promulgated, restricting and regulating the entry of certain aliens into the Union of South Africa and regulating the right of any person to assume a surname.

April
 5 – Sir Patrick Duncan is appointed the 6th Governor-General of the Union of South Africa, the first South African to hold the position.

Births
 Eric Bhamuza Sono, captain of Orlando Pirates F.C. and was the father of soccer player & coach Jomo Sono (d. 1964)
 29 March – Marike de Klerk, politician, First Lady of South Africa, as the wife of State President Frederik Willem de Klerk, from 1989-1994
 5 May – Ray Ntlokwana, actor, affectionately known as "Velaphi" following his lead role in the SABC Xhosa play, Velaphi
 1 July – Ebrahim Ismail Ebrahim, political activist (d. 2021)
 4 July – Clive Scott (actor), actor
 6 July – Bessie Head, writer (d. 1986)
 18 September – Ivy Matsepe-Casaburri, politician, in Kroonstad. (d. 2009)
 19 October – Jonas Gwangwa, jazz musician, songwriter and producer

Deaths

Railways

Locomotives
Four new locomotive types, three steam and one electric, enter service on the South African Railways (SAR):
 The first of 235 Class 19D 4-8-2 Mountain type steam locomotives.
 A single Class 21  Texas type steam locomotive.
 The first of thirty-four  narrow gauge 2-6-2+2-6-2 Double Prairie type Garratt articulated locomotives.
 Three German-built 3 kV DC Class 2E electric locomotives.

References

History of South Africa